Springfield Traction Company was a company that operated surface Horse, Steam, and Electric Trams and Streetcars across the Springfield Metro from around 1869 to August 1937.

Lines run
The only known name of a line that the Springfield Traction Company ran is the Woodland Heights Line, However, the whole city was covered by the system by 1929. Two other names have been suspected to have been named the "Downtown Line" and the "Commercial Street Line".

History
The original horse and mule powered street railway in Springfield, Missouri began operation around 1869. It operated on a line connecting the Square to the Commercial Street district along Boonville, then down Benton to what was then the passenger train depot.

By 1929 the electric streetcar system covered what was then the entire city limits, giving citizens universal access to public transportation. Streetcar lines radiated in four directions from Park Central Square, creating a beehive of activity in the heart of the city.

In 1936, the Springfield Traction Company announced that the next year the electric streetcars would be replaced by gasoline-powered buses. To them, it seemed “the modern thing to do.” A final streetcar parade was held on August 2, 1937, with people cramming into the cars for one last ride.

References

https://thelibrary.org/lochist/history/paspres/ch7.html

1879 establishments in Missouri
1937 disestablishments in Missouri
Defunct public transport operators in the United States
Defunct companies based in Missouri
American companies disestablished in 1937
American companies established in 1869